In geometry, the great duoantiprism is the only uniform star-duoantiprism solution   in 4-dimensional geometry. It has Schläfli symbol   or  Coxeter diagram , constructed from 10 pentagonal antiprisms, 10 pentagrammic crossed-antiprisms, and 50 tetrahedra.

Its vertices are a subset of those of the small stellated 120-cell.

Construction 
The great duoantiprism can be constructed from a nonuniform variant of the 10-10/3 duoprism (a duoprism of a decagon and a decagram) where the decagram's edge length is around 1.618 (golden ratio) times the edge length of the decagon via an alternation process. The decagonal prisms alternate into pentagonal antiprisms, the decagrammic prisms alternate into pentagrammic crossed-antiprisms with new regular tetrahedra created at the deleted vertices. This is the only uniform solution for the p-q duoantiprism aside from the regular 16-cell (as a 2-2 duoantiprism).

Images

Other names 
 Great duoantiprism (gudap) Jonathan Bowers

References

Regular Polytopes, H. S. M. Coxeter, Dover Publications, Inc., 1973, New York, p. 124.
 Norman Johnson Uniform Polytopes, Manuscript (1991)
 N.W. Johnson: The Theory of Uniform Polytopes and Honeycombs, Ph.D. Dissertation, University of Toronto, 1966
 

4-polytopes